Sterling is an unincorporated community and census-designated place (CDP) in Glynn County, Georgia, United States, located on U.S. Route 341. Sterling consists of several small churches and general stores.  It is included in the Brunswick, Georgia statistical area. Its zip code is 31525.

It was first listed as a CDP in the 2020 census with a population of 2,534.

Sterling formerly had a station on the Macon and Brunswick Railroad.

Demographics

2020 census

Note: the US Census treats Hispanic/Latino as an ethnic category. This table excludes Latinos from the racial categories and assigns them to a separate category. Hispanics/Latinos can be of any race.

Education

Glynn County's public schools are operated by Glynn County School System.

Zoned schools include:
 Sterling Elementary School (SES)
 Jane Macon Middle School (JMS)
 Brunswick High School (BHS)

References

Populated places in Glynn County, Georgia
Census-designated places in Glynn County, Georgia